This is a list of episodes from The Sylvester & Tweety Mysteries, featuring Granny, Sylvester, Tweety and Hector as globe-trotting detectives.

Series overview

Episodes

Season 1 (1995–96)

Season 2 (1996–97) 
Note: All seasons from here on out now have two 11-minute segments instead of a full-length episode.

Season 3 (1997–98)

Season 4 (1998–99)

Season 5 (1999–2002) 
Beginning this season, the show switches from traditional hand-painted cels to digital ink and paint. The final episode, consisting of the stories "The Tail End" and "This is the End", was meant to air in 2000 but the show was cancelled before it could air, and didn't air on television until December 18, 2002, on Cartoon Network.

References

External links 
 

Sylvester and Tweety Mysteries